Quasi-equivalence could refer to

 Weak equivalence (homotopy theory)
 Quasi-isometry
 Quasi-isomorphism
 The Caspar-Klug theory of viral capsids.